Hugh Richmond (9 March 1893 – 1940) was a Scottish footballer who played in the Football League for Coventry City, Leicester City and Queens Park Rangers.

References

1893 births
1940 deaths
Scottish footballers
Association football midfielders
English Football League players
Kilbirnie Ladeside F.C. players
Kilmarnock F.C. players
Galston F.C. players
Arthurlie F.C. players
Leicester City F.C. players
Nuneaton Borough F.C. players
Coventry City F.C. players
Queens Park Rangers F.C. players
Blyth Spartans A.F.C. players
Spennymoor United F.C. players
Bedlington United A.F.C. players